In the Family is a 2011 independent drama film that was the directorial debut of Patrick Wang. It tells the story of the surviving partner's attempt to maintain his relationship with his dead partner's young son.

Cast
 Sebastian Banes – Chip Hines
 Patrick Wang – Joey Williams or Chin-Mei Lang (pre-foster name)
 Trevor St. John – Cody Hines
 Park Overall - Sally Hines
 Chip Taylor - Darryl Hines
 Kelly McAndrew - Eileen Robey
 Peter Hermann - Dave Robey
 Eisa Davis - Anne Carter
 Zoe Winters - Helene
 Christina Hogue - Cheryl
 Elaine Bromka - Gloria
 Brian Murray - Paul Hawkes
 Susan Kellerman - Marge Hawkes

Reception

Critical response
The film has received critical acclaim since its release.
Rotten Tomatoes gives a score of 97% based on 29 reviews, with an average score of 8.4/10.
At Metacritic it scored 82% based on reviews from 9 critics, considered "universal acclaim".

Acclaimed film critic Roger Ebert awarded the film 4 out of 4 stars and quote, "I was completely absorbed from beginning to end. What a courageous first feature this is, a film that sidesteps shopworn stereotypes and tells a quiet, firm, deeply humanist story about doing the right thing".

Kevin Uhlich of Time Out New York awarded the film 5 out of 5 stars and wrote "No doubt you've noticed the nearly three-hour runtime, but please don't let that dissuade you: Every moment counts in this gripping tale".

Frank Scheck of The Hollywood Reporter called the film "deeply humanistic, profoundly touching work representing independent cinema at its finest".

Paul Brunick of The New York Times said, "Mr. Wang's slow-reveal psychological drama isn't just a showcase for his excellent ensemble cast. Beautifully modulated and stylistically sui generis, In the Family is also one of the most accomplished and undersold directorial debuts this year".

Rob Humanick of Slant magazine liked the film and awarded the film 4 out of 4 stars, and wrote in his review, "An acutely felt, altogether devastating family drama as intimate and affecting as it is sprawling and untamed."

Robert Abele from the Los Angeles Times and said in this positive review, "Deliberate and marked by uncommon grace, In The Family manages to feel politically and culturally acute without ever resorting to melodrama, or having to wave banners for issues or causes, except perhaps in its quiet way for a renewed humanism in movies and a return to stories about everyday lives", and "These days, a movie so invested in the highs and lows of caring for others can only be a remarkable, cherished thing."

Andrew Schenker of Village Voice said of In the Family that "With an incisive understanding of character, believably naturalistic acting, and lengthy scenes that don't feel stretched out so much as given room to breathe, In the Family proves that smart direction and an innate feeling for one's material trumps potentially precious subject matter."

Accolades 

The film was nominated for the Independent Spirit Award for Best First Feature in 2012.

Sebastian Banes won the Young Artist Award for Best Supporting Young Actor Age Ten and Under.

The film also received "Best Feature" awards at the San Diego Asian Film Festival, the San Francisco International Asian American Film Festival, and the Spokane International Film Festival, with Wang receiving "Best Emerging Filmmaker" awards at all three festivals, as well.

References

External links
 
 
 
 
 

2011 films
Films about Chinese Americans
Films about Taiwanese Americans
American drama films
American LGBT-related films
Films set in Tennessee
Films about interracial romance
Gay-related films
LGBT-related films about Chinese Americans
2011 drama films
Films directed by Patrick Wang
Asian-American drama films
2011 independent films
2010s English-language films
2010s American films